Final Audition is a Canadian musical competition television miniseries which aired on CBC Television in 1978.

Premise
These broadcasts featured the top 15 entrants of cigarette brand du Maurier's Search For Talent competition. The first three episodes each featured performances from five of the entrants. The five finalists from those broadcasts were featured on a live fourth episode from Toronto's Queen Elizabeth Theatre. The finalists were promised further exposure on the CBC.

Scheduling
This hour-long series was broadcast on Fridays at 9:00 p.m. (Eastern) from 31 March to 19 May 1978.

See also
 Canadian Idol

References

External links
 

CBC Television original programming
1978 Canadian television series debuts
1978 Canadian television series endings